The Delaware Fightin' Blue Hens college football team represents the University of Delaware in the Colonial Athletic Association (CAA). The Fightin' Blue Hens compete as part of the National Collegiate Athletic Association (NCAA) Division I Football Championship Subdivision. The program has had 23 head coaches (and one interim head coach) since it began play during the 1889 season, with Ryan Carty hired as the 24th head coach.

The team has played more than 1,159 games over 123 seasons. Harold "Tubby" Raymond is the leader in seasons coached and games won, with 300 victories during his 36 years with the program. William D. Murray has the highest winning percentage, with .747. Ira L. Pierce has the lowest winning percentage, as his team lost all six of their games in 1896.

Of the 23 different head coaches who have led the Blue Hens, Murray, David M. Nelson, and Raymond have been inducted as head coaches into the College Football Hall of Fame.

Key

Coaches

Notes

References 
General

 

Specific

Lists of college football head coaches
Delaware Fightin' Blue Hens football coaches